JMDB can refer to:
Japanese Movie Database, an online database of Japanese films
Java Movie Database, an alternative interface for the Internet Movie Database (IMDb) data
José Manuel Durão Barroso, a Portuguese politician and the 11th President of the European Commission